XCR can stand for:
 Extended Control Register in the x86 architecture
 Robinson Armament XCR, a multi-caliber, gas piston combat rifle
 Vatry Airport in France (IATA code)